Lake Rosseau is located in Ontario, Canada, about  north of Toronto. The south end of the lake is in the Township of Muskoka Lakes, and the north end is in Seguin Township.  The lake is surrounded by many cottages, some dating back to the late 19th century.

The village of Rosseau is located at the northern tip of Lake Rosseau and is the location of one of the original Ontario summer resorts which brought exposure to the area. Pratts Point and Rosseau House were well known and although the hotel was destroyed long ago, the vista and scenery remain. Windermere House is a resort located at Lake Rosseau.

Geography
Lake Rosseau is connected to Lake Joseph through the narrows at Port Sandfield and the Joseph River.  The lake is also connected to Lake Muskoka by the Indian River and the lock system at Port Carling.

Communities
Communities on Lake Rosseau include Port Carling, Minett, Windermere, Rosseau and Port Sandfield.

Community organizations
There are many community groups based on Lake Rosseau.  The largest of these is the Muskoka Lakes Association.

Notable people
Many notable people have owned cottages on the lake, including Goldie Hawn, Ted Rogers, William Eli Sanford, Martin Short, Lillian Massey Treble and Steve Yzerman. The President of the United States, Woodrow Wilson (1913–1921), frequently holidayed on Lake Rosseau, and eventually bought Formosa Island. There is a curious story that in 1914 he signed the register of the Bala Bay Inn after the outbreak of World War I; however, there is no official record of the president being in Canada at that time.

See also
List of lakes in Ontario

References

External links

 Township of Muskoka Lakes

Lakes of the District Municipality of Muskoka
Lakes of Parry Sound District